The Touch is a  long river in southwestern France, left tributary of the Garonne. Its source is in the département of Haute-Garonne, near Lilhac.

It flows through the following départements and towns:
Haute-Garonne: Bérat, Lherm, Plaisance-du-Touch, Tournefeuille, Blagnac, Toulouse.

It flows into the river Garonne at Toulouse.

References

External links

History and real-time water heights of the Touch river, a Garonne river tributary

Rivers of France
Rivers of Occitania (administrative region)
Rivers of Haute-Garonne